Adibatla is a village in Ranga Reddy district near eastern part of Hyderabad, Telangana, India. It derives its name from the erstwhile ruler of Bijapur, Yusuf Adil Shah. The TATA Aerospace SEZ is located here.

Tata Advance System Ltd., a unit of the Tata Group, has sought and obtained 50 acres of land in the 250-acre Aerospace and Precision Engineering Special Economic Zone (SEZ) that is coming up at Adibatla in Ibrahimpatnam mandal in Ranga Reddy district not far from Hyderabad. "It will be the first aerospace SEZ in the country. The formal approval for the SEZ was accorded by the centre in March 2008 and the notification is expected shortly," state government sources told 'TOI'.

In all, the state has identified 351 acres at Adibatla village. While the SEZ would come up on 250 acres, the remaining 100 acres has been earmarked for other ancillary units. Apart from the Tata unit, land is to be allotted to MTAR and other local manufacturers both within and outside the SEZ.

See also
 Raviryal
 Wonderla Amusement Park, Hyderabad
 GMR Aerocity Hyderabad
 Novotel Hyderabad Airport Hotel

References

Neighbourhoods in Hyderabad, India
Villages in Ranga Reddy district